The 2018 Belgian Grand Prix (formally the Formula 1 2018 Johnnie Walker Belgian Grand Prix) was a Formula One motor race held on 26 August 2018 at the Circuit de Spa-Francorchamps in Stavelot, Belgium. The race was the thirteenth round of the 2018 Formula One World Championship and marked the 74th running of the Belgian Grand Prix and the 61st time the race was held at Spa-Francorchamps and 51st time as a round of the World Championship.

The race was won by Scuderia Ferrari's Sebastian Vettel ahead of Mercedes' Lewis Hamilton and Red Bull Racing's Max Verstappen. The victory moved Vettel ahead of Alain Prost in all-time career Formula One victories and would be his last win for over a year until the 2019 Singapore Grand Prix.

Report

Background
After going into administration during the  weekend, Force India arrived in Belgium under new ownership. A consortium led by Lawrence Stroll purchased the racing assets and operations of Force India through a company named Racing Point UK Ltd. The original team, Sahara Force India, was excluded from the Constructors' Championship due to their inability to participate in the remaining races, allowing the new team known as Racing Point Force India to apply for a late entry and start their participation in the championship in Belgium.

Championship standings before the race
Mercedes driver Lewis Hamilton entered the round with a 24-point lead over Sebastian Vettel in the Drivers' Championship. In the World Constructors' Championship, Mercedes led Ferrari by 10 points.

Practice
McLaren reserve driver Lando Norris made his first appearance at a Grand Prix weekend, replacing Fernando Alonso during the first practice session.

Race
The race was won by Scuderia Ferrari's Sebastian Vettel ahead of Mercedes' Lewis Hamilton and Red Bull Racing's Max Verstappen. With the win Vettel took his 52nd and overtook Alain Prost for third in the ranking of drivers with the most Formula One wins. The race featured a first lap crash involving Fernando Alonso, Nico Hülkenberg, and Charles Leclerc. Hülkenberg misjudged his braking before ramming into the back of Alonso, before flying over Leclerc's car and landing on the halo.

After the first corner incidents, Vettel passed Hamilton on the Kemmel straight on lap 1. Hamilton tried to repass at the end of the straight, as did the two Racing Point cars of Ocon and Pérez, and they were four abreast in the braking zone, with Vettel staying ahead. Hamilton was not able to challenge Vettel again.

Classification

Qualifying 

Notes

  – Valtteri Bottas, Nico Hülkenberg, Carlos Sainz Jr. and Stoffel Vandoorne all received a 30-place grid penalty for exceeding their quota of power unit elements.

Race

Notes
  – Valtteri Bottas received a 5-second time penalty for causing a collision with Sergey Sirotkin.

Championship standings after the race 

Drivers' Championship standings

Constructors' Championship standings

 Note: Only the top five positions are included for both sets of standings.

See also
 2018 Spa-Francorchamps Formula 2 round
 2018 Spa-Francorchamps GP3 Series round

Notes

References

Belgian
Grand Prix
Belgian Grand Prix
Belgian Grand Prix